Quinn Sharp (born November 12, 1989) is a former American football placekicker. He played college football for the Oklahoma State Cowboys.

High school career
Sharp played football & baseball at Mansfield Summit High School in Arlington, Texas.

College career
After taking a redshirt year in 2008 (as he did on purpose), Sharp took over as both starting punter and kickoff specialist for the Oklahoma State Cowboys. He earned mid-season freshman All-America honors from Rivals.com in 2009. In the Cotton Bowl, he averaged over 50 yards per punt, including one 63 yarder.

NFL career
Sharp entered the 2013 NFL draft where he wasn't chosen but later came to terms with the Cincinnati Bengals. On August 25 Sharp was cut from Cincinnati who had to make their 53-man roster cuts.

CFL career
On October 27, 2013, Sharp signed with the Toronto Argonauts of the Canadian Football League. After playing in one game with the Argonauts, he was released by the team on November 7, 2013.

He was signed to the Saskatchewan Roughriders' practice roster on October 8, 2014.

References

External links
CFL profile
Saskatchewan Roughriders bio 

1989 births
Living people
American football punters
Canadian football placekickers
American players of Canadian football
Oklahoma State Cowboys football players
Players of American football from Texas
Sportspeople from Arlington, Texas
People from Mansfield, Texas
Cincinnati Bengals players
Toronto Argonauts players
Saskatchewan Roughriders players
People from Grapevine, Texas